Tin Ka Ping Secondary School is an English medium (EMI) secondary school located in Fanling, Sheung Shui, Hong Kong, founded in 1994. With subsidy from the government, it provides students with various amenities such as practice rooms for extensive arts, audio-visual equipment and sports facilities.

School History
The school was established by Dr. Tin Ka-ping's fund. Dr. Tin Ka-ping is a Hong Kong industrialist and philanthropist, who is well known for his contributions to education development, including moral education and teacher training. The school ideal aims at "quality all-round education", focusing on students' talents, moral characteristics and self-esteem.

Extracurricular activities
Art Club
Computer Club
English Society
Chinese Culture Promotion Group
Maths Club
Science Club
Art of Life Skills
Chinese Society
Putonghua Group
School Reporters
Music Society
Writing Scripters
English Drama Club
English Debating Team
School Choir(Junior and Senior)
Guitar Class
Violin Class
School Chinese Orchestra
Community Youth Club
Girl Guides
Scouts
Library Assistants
School Prefects
Multi-media Production Unit
Art Room Assistants
Technology Education Room Assistants
English Corner Assistants
Language Laboratory Assistants
Bridge & Chess Club
Drama Club
Green Group
Hiking Club
Handicraft Class
Dance Club
Technology Club
Christian Fellowship

School Teams
Tin Ka Ping Secondary School also have a lot of sport teams and have a good quality.
 Table Tennis Team
 Swimming Team
 Volleyball Team (Girls)
 Football Team (Boys)
 Basketball Team (Boys)
 Basketball Team (Girls)
 Tennis Team
 Badminton Team
 Rowing Boat Team
 Trampoline Team
 Track and Field Team

Publications
 The Green Field (Chinese "田園") - School Yearbook
 Ping Fong Collection (Chinese "並放集") - School Prose (Chinese & English)
 TKP Post (Chinese "田中報") - School Newspaper (Chinese)
 Writing Scripters - School Newspaper (English)

See also
 Education in Hong Kong
 List of buildings and structures in Hong Kong
 list of schools in Hong Kong

References

Secondary schools in Hong Kong
Government schools in Hong Kong
Educational institutions established in 1994
1994 establishments in Hong Kong
North District, Hong Kong